Beijing Guoan Football Club is a professional Chinese football club that currently participates in the Chinese Super League under licence from the Chinese Football Association (CFA). The team is based in the Chaoyang District in Beijing. Since its inception, Beijing Guoan have had 23 managers. Bruno Génésio is the current manager.

Background
Tang Pengju was the club's first manager during their professional season. Beijing finished in a disappointing eighth out of twelve teams and the manager Tang Pengju was relieved of his duties. Serbian Milovan Đorić would be Beijing's first foray with a foreign manager when he joined the club at the start of the 2000 league season. His reign was exceptionally short-lived after he lost his first three games of the season before he was replaced with native coach Wei Kexing.

Jin Zhiyang became the first manager who lead Beijing to their first professional trophy when he beat Jinan Taishan Jiangjun 4–1 to lift the 1996 Chinese FA Cup. He is also the club's most successful manager in terms of trophies won, for 2 Chinese FA Cup Champions. After the dismissal of Lee Jang-soo in September 2009, as the caretaker manager, former Beijing player Hong Yuanshuo was immediately brought into the team and on the final day of the season Beijing thrashed Hangzhou Greentown 4–0 to clinch the 2009 league championship, and this is the only league champion they have won so far.

Managers
Information correct after match played on 1 December 2019. Only competitive matches since 1994 are counted.
Table headers
 Nationality – If the manager played international football as a player, the country/countries he played for are shown. Otherwise, the manager's nationality is given as their country of birth.
 P – The number of games managed for Beijing Guoan.
 W – The number of games won as a manager.
 D – The number of games draw as a manager.
 L – The number of games lost as a manager.
 GF – The number of goals scored under his management.
 GA – The number of goals conceded under his management.
 Win% – The total winning percentage under his management.
 Honours – The trophies won while managing Beijing Guoan.

Notes

References

 
Beijing Guoan